Christian Meier (born February 21, 1985) is a Canadian former racing cyclist who rode professionally between 2005 and 2016 for the ,  and  and  teams.

Born in Sussex, New Brunswick, Meier is descended from German restaurateurs who settled outside Sussex, Canada and he attended Sussex Regional High School. His brother Michael succumbed to cancer in 2010. He rode all three Grand Tours in his career, making a total of five Grand Tour starts, his last being the 2014 Tour de France. He announced his retirement from competition in September 2016, despite having a year to run on his contract with the Orica team. After retiring, he contested the 2018 Canadian National Time Trial Championships, finishing 27th.

Personal life
In March 2015 Meier together with his wife Amber opened La Fabrica Girona, a coffee shop in their European home of Girona, Spain. The following year they opened a second coffee shop, Espresso Mafia, nearby.

Major results
Source: 

2006
 4th Overall Vuelta a Chihuahua
2007
 1st  Road race, National Under-23 Road Championships
 2nd Overall Vuelta a Chihuahua
1st Young rider classification
 2nd Overall Vuelta a El Salvador
1st Young rider classification
 7th Liège–Bastogne–Liège U23
2008
 1st  Road race, National Road Championships
2009
 2nd Time trial, National Road Championships
2010
 1st  Sprints classification, Tour of the Basque Country
 7th Overall Tour of Britain
 10th Giro del Veneto
2011
 2nd Time trial, National Road Championships
 8th Overall Vuelta a Asturias
2012
 2nd Time trial, National Road Championships
 3rd Overall Tour de Beauce
 5th Japan Cup
2013
 1st  Sprints classification, Volta a Catalunya
 2nd Time trial, National Road Championships
 3rd Overall Tour de Beauce
2014
 1st Mountains classification, Bayern–Rundfahrt
 3rd Road race, National Road Championships
2015
 3rd Time trial, National Road Championships

References

External links

Canadian male cyclists
1985 births
Living people